Adolf Metzner (25 April 1910 in Frankenthal – 5 March 1978 in Hamburg) was a German athlete who competed in the 1932 Summer Olympics and in the 1936 Summer Olympics. After finishing his career due to Achilles tendon rupture he became a carpenter in the Bavaria region of Germany. In 1947 he worked with Ernst Gadermann to develop the first telemetric measurements of the ECG in athletes.

References

1910 births
1978 deaths
People from Frankenthal
German male sprinters
Olympic athletes of Germany
Athletes (track and field) at the 1932 Summer Olympics
Athletes (track and field) at the 1936 Summer Olympics
European Athletics Championships medalists
SS officers
Waffen-SS personnel
Sportspeople from Rhineland-Palatinate